Randy Richard Bucyk (born November 9, 1962) is a Canadian former professional ice hockey player who played 19 games in the National Hockey League with the Montreal Canadiens and Calgary Flames between 1986 and 1988. He is the nephew of NHL Hall of Famer Johnny Bucyk.

In 1985 Bucyk won the Calder Cup as American Hockey League championship with the Sherbrooke Canadiens. He was then called a couple of times during the 1985–86 season to play for the Montreal Canadiens, and he skated with the Canadiens for 17 regular season games and 2 playoff games during the Canadiens' Stanley Cup winning season. Although Bucyk was included on the team winning picture and received a Stanley Cup ring from the Canadiens, his name is not engraved on the Stanley Cup.

Career statistics

Regular season and playoffs

References

External links

1962 births
Living people
Calgary Flames players
Canadian ice hockey centres
Canadian people of Ukrainian descent
Montreal Canadiens players
Northeastern Huskies men's ice hockey players
Salt Lake Golden Eagles (IHL) players
Sherbrooke Canadiens players
Ice hockey people from Edmonton
Undrafted National Hockey League players